The Complete Studio Recordings may refer to:

 The Complete Studio Recordings (ABBA album)
 The Complete Studio Recordings (The Doors album)
 The Complete Studio Recordings (Led Zeppelin album)
 The Complete Studio Recordings (Roxy Music album)

See also